Lewis Thomas Wattson, SA, better known as Father Paul Wattson (January 16, 1863 - February 8, 1940), was an American priest who co-founded the Society of the Atonement and the Christian Unity Octave in The Episcopal Church.  He was later received into the Catholic Church and is remembered as an advocate for ecumenism.

Wattson has been named a Servant of God, the first stage of a candidate for canonization.

References

External links
Digital files on Wattson's ministry as an Episcopalian from the Episcopal Diocese of New York

1863 births
1940 deaths
American Servants of God